Hayko Cepkin (born 11 March 1978) is a Turkish musician of Armenian descent.

Beginnings
Hayko Cepkin has shared the stage with the likes of Kurban, Öztürk, Birol Namoğlu, Ogün Sanlısoy, Aylin Aslım, Koray Candemir and Demir Demirkan. Some of these artists have regularly contributed to his albums as well. He has also worked as a composer, and composed and arranged the Yeni Türkü "Kimdi Giden" on Murathan Mungan's album Söz Vermiş Şarkılar, which was song by Aylin Aslım. He also had a duet with Ogün Sanlısoy on the song "Korkma". He was also involved in Sanlısoy's album as a keyboard player for the song "Kaybettik Severken".

Other ventures

Cepkin has organized and appeared in many events in relation to his music career. In 2006, 2007 and 2009 he participated in the Rock'n Coke and 2007 took part in Rock Müzikaller and Van için Rock. He composed the soundtrack for the movie Araf, and his song "Son Kez" from the album Sakin Olmam Lazım was featured on the movie's soundtrack as well. At the same time, he portrayed the character of "İsfandiyar" in the fantasy drama movie Çocuk in 2008.

In Ramadan, Cepkin recorded the song "Demedim mi?" for TRT, the lyrics of which were written by Pir Sultan Abdal. A music video was later shot for the song.

In 2010, he was a judge on Rock'n Dark.
At the series' final on 30 April 2010, he performed on stage together with Anneke van Giersbergen. He then took part in Sonisphere festival.

In April 2014, within the framework of the "Ünlüler Etapta" organization, he co-piloted alongside Tunç Tuncer in the Aegean Rally.

Lawsuits 
On 3 August 2009, in response to the question "How do you find Hayko Cepkin?" in a program on Cine5, Davut Güloğlu said "He looks like a monkey, as if he has come out of a horror movie, it's not clear whether he looks like a cat or a dog, the likes of him are buffoons, if I see something like him at night, I would definitely attack it." After his comments, Cepkin took a case to the court and filed a lawsuit on the grounds of "personal offense" and demanded 2 years in prison as punishment for Davut Güloğlu.

In a press statement sent through his lawyer, Cepkin said that he had filed a lawsuit against Güloğlu by taking the case to the prosecutor. He referred to Güloğlu's comments, pointing out heavy insults, threats and violence against himself in them, all of which were meant to target him in a way that is no accepted in society. The case was made open to the public and press, and the court decided to stop the trial after a while.

Discography 
Albums
 2005: Sakin Olmam Lazım
 2007: Tanışma Bitti 
 2010: Sandık 
 2012: Aşkın Izdırabını...
 2016: Beni Büyüten Şarkılar Vol.1
 2020: Karantina Günlüğü (with Burak Malçok)

EPs
 2019: Kabul Olur / Dans Et

Singles
 2018: "Azad" (with Cenk Durmazel)
 2020: "Hayvaaağ1n"
 2020: "Tutacağım Ellerini" (with Cem Adrian and Halil Sezai)
 2022: "Destina" (Yeni Türkü Zamansız)

Filmography 
 2005 – Balans ve Manevra
 2008 – Çocuk
 2009 – İstenmeyen Tüyler
 2009 – 1 Erkek 1 Kadın
 2012 – Acayip Hikayeler

Television 
 2010 – Gecekondu – Supporting role/Star TV
 2011 – Extreme-G – Presenter/CNN Türk
 2012 – Acayip Hikayeler – Presenter/Star TV
 2012 – Kulaktan Kulağa – Guest artist/Trt Müzik
 2014 – Arkadaşım Hoşgeldin – Guest artist/Kanal D
 2014 – Extreme – Presenter/Dream TV
 2014 – Kardeş Payı – (22nd episode, supporting role)
 2016 – Güldür Güldür Show – Guest artist/Show TV

References

External links
Hayko Cepkin Official Website

1978 births
Living people
Turkish rock musicians
Armenian rock musicians
Turkish people of Armenian descent
Musicians from Istanbul
Alternative metal musicians
Industrial rock musicians
Alternative rock musicians
Turkish heavy metal singers
Industrial musicians
Musical groups from Istanbul
Ethnic Armenian male singers
21st-century Turkish singers
21st-century Turkish male singers